UB City is a luxury business district in Bengaluru, India. It consists of 6 blocks, UB Tower, Kingfisher Plaza, Concorde, Canberra, Comet, and Kingfisher Towers, with a total built up area of over 16 lakh sq ft.

Location

Centrally located in the Bengaluru CBD (Central Business District), on the corner of Kasturba road and Vittal Mallya Road, it is just  from M.G. Road - Brigade road junction and right opposite Cubbon Park now officially renamed Sri Chamarajendra Park.

The project

UB City has four towers namely, UB Tower (20 Floors), Comet (11 Floors), Canberra (18 Floors), and Concorde (20 Floors). The latter three towers are all named after aircraft. UB City houses the offices of many corporates under one roof - UB Tower. Concorde & Canberra all have retail space on the lower floors and office space in the higher levels, while Comet will has serviced apartments. The multifamily property houses commercial offices, banks, high-end retail stores, Prestige Oakwood serviced apartments, curated fine-dining restaurants, spa / health clubs, cafes to hang out at, etc.  Multi-level parking areas offer parking of 4 wheelers up to 1600 units. Also there is a functional an amphitheatre with food courts and landscaped gardens. It is very breezy sometimes. The property also has a beautiful Art Gallery and holds the annual cultural event - Art Bengaluru.

An elevated roof top helipad provides a five-minute aerial commute to the Kempegowda International Airport.

UB City The Collection houses the most luxurious 'global' brands from many business houses across India including Reliance Group, Aditya Birla Group, et al.

The project now also houses the Kingfisher Towers in the same piece of land. Palatial condos here house many HNI's of India.

The top floor consists of many restaurants including pho, hotpot, and Korean barbecue.

Gallery

See also
List of tallest buildings in Bangalore
List of tallest buildings in India
List of tallest buildings and structures in the Indian subcontinent

References

External links

UB Group page on project
Prestige Group Page on HDFCRED

Buildings and structures in Bangalore
Office buildings completed in 2008
Residential buildings completed in 2008
Skyscraper office buildings in India
Central business districts in India
United Breweries Group
2008 establishments in Karnataka